Karen Astrid Hallberg (born May 10, 1964) is an Argentine professor of physics at the Balseiro Institute. She is Research Director at the Bariloche Atomic Centre and a 2019 L'Oreal-UNESCO Award for Women in Science Laureate.

Early life and education 
Hallberg was born in Rosario, Argentina. Her father, Ronaldo Hallberg, worked in a mining company. She moved to San Salvador de Jujuy, where she attended the Colegio Nacional de Jujuy. She was known as “señorita por qué” ('Miss why'), and started an all-girls science club. As a teenager Hallberg was a competitive tennis player. She began her studies in electronic engineering at the National University of Rosario. Hallberg earned a scholarship of the National Atomic Energy Commission to study at the Instituto Balseiro, National University of Cuyo, where she earned a degree in physics. She worked alongside Francisco de la Cruz on the emerging field of superconductivity. After completing her graduate degree, she started a doctorate in physics at the Balseiro Institute under the supervision of Dr. Carlos Balseiro. For her doctoral studies Hallberg worked on computational models of quantum materials that demonstrate low dimensional magnetism and superconductivity. When Hallberg arrived at the Bariloche Atomic Centre only 8% of the students were women.

Research and career 
After her PhD, Hallberg moved to Germany to work as a postdoctoral researcher at the Max Planck Institute for Solid State Research (MPI-FKF) and at the Max Planck Institute for the Physics of Complex Systems (MPI-PKS). Hallberg returned to the Bariloche Atomic Centre in 1997. She has extensively developed computer simulations to understand quantum matter. She is interested in emergent properties such as conductivity, superconductivity and magnetism. Hallberg is a researcher at National Scientific and Technical Research Council (CONICET) and led the National Atomic Energy Commission (CNEA) condensed matter theory group at the Bariloche Atomic Center. She is a Senior Associate of the International Centre for Theoretical Physics (ICTP) and of the International Center for Theoretical Physics-South American Institute for Fundamental Research (ICTP-SAIFR). Hallberg worked on several numerical tools, including the density matrix renormalization group (DMRG), a numerical method that can be used for low-dimensional strongly correlated bosonic and fermionic systems. She has studied superconductivity, magnetic order and spin-orbit coupling in complex materials and electronic transport in nanoscopic systems. She has visited and collaborated with centers such as the Indian Institute of Sciences (Bangalore), Oxford University (UK), the London Center for Nanotechnology (UK), University of Augsburg (Germany), University of Fribourg (Switzerland), University of Boston and Argonne National Lab (US) and the University of Tokyo.

Advocacy and academic service 
Hallberg has spoken for the need eliminate institutional barriers for women scientists, and for more support to be given to women. She was awarded the 2019 L'Oréal-UNESCO For Women in Science Award. She has also discussed the need for improved access to science for people from different socioeconomic backgrounds, as well as more recognition for teachers. Hallberg is committed to nuclear disarmament, and is a council member of the Pugwash Conferences on Science and World Affairs and member of the Advisory Board of International Student Young Pugwash (ISYP). She is also committed to ethics in science and is a member of the Argentine Committee on Ethics in Science and Technology (CECTE). She currently is an International Councilor and Board Member of the American Physical Society (APS), member of the World Economic Forum’s Global Future Council on Quantum Applications, member of the advisory board of the International Institute of Physics (Natal, Brazil), member of the Advisory Board of Papers in Physics and member of the Board of Directors of the Bunge and Born Foundation, and  member of the Editorial Board of Physical Review Research (APS). She was Director of the Condensed Matter Department at the Atomic Center in Bariloche, editor of the journal Europhysics Letters, member of the Board of Directors of the Aspen Science Center, Argentine representative and Board Chair of the Latin American Center of Physics (CLAF), Vice Chair of the Low Temperature Commission of the International Union of Pure and Applied Physics (IUPAP), member of the Argentine Physical Association (AFA) Steering Committee and coordinator of the Women in Physics and Ethics subcommittees and the representative of the Argentine Branch to the International Institute for Complex Adaptive Matter (ICAM).

Awards and honors 
Her awards and honors include:
 2019 L'Oreal-UNESCO Award for Women in Science Laureate
Honorary member, Argentine Center for Engineering
 Corresponding Member of the National Academy for Exact and Natural Sciences, Argentina
 Member, Latin American Academy of Sciences (ACAL)
Doctor Honoris Causa, National University of Jujuy, Argentina
Doctor Honoris Causa, Universidad Siglo 21, Argentina

 Honorable Mention by the Argentine Senate "Senator Domingo Faustino Sarmiento"
 Honorable Mention by the Argentine Senate ”Juana Azurduy de Padilla”

 Recognition by the Honorable Argentine Chamber of Deputies
 Recognition by the Legislatures of the provinces of Río Negro and Chaco, Argentina
 Illustrious Citizen of the province of Jujuy, Argentina
 Distinguished Citizen of the city of San Salvador de Jujuy, Argentina
 ”Bachiller de Honor”, Colegio Nacional High School, S. S de Jujuy
 2007 Guggenheim Fellowship
 2008 L'Oréal - National Scientific and Technical Research Council Special Mention for her work on quantum properties in nanoscopic systems
 2012 Aspen Ideas Festival Scholar

Personal life 
Hallberg is married to physicist Ingo Allekotte, with whom she has two children. She plays the cello.

Outreach 

 Tedx Bariloche talk (21 Sept 2019) 

 ”The fascinating and weird world of quantum matter”, Public Lecture, Perimeter Institute, Canada, Dec. 2 2020

References

External links 
 

Argentine women scientists
Argentine physicists
1964 births
People from Rosario, Santa Fe
Condensed matter physicists
Living people
L'Oréal-UNESCO Awards for Women in Science laureates